The 1983–84 Portland Trail Blazers season was the 14th season of the franchise in the National Basketball Association (NBA).

The season is memorable when the Blazers drafted Clyde Drexler with the 14th pick of the 1983 NBA Draft.

Offseason

NBA Draft

Note:  This is not a complete list; only the first two rounds are covered, as well as any other picks by the franchise who played at least one NBA game.

Roster

Regular season

Season standings

Notes
 z, y – division champions
 x – clinched playoff spot

Record vs. opponents

Game log

Playoffs

|- align="center" bgcolor="#ffcccc"
| 1
| April 18
| Phoenix
| L 106–113
| Kenny Carr (24)
| Calvin Natt (9)
| Thompson, Valentine (6)
| Memorial Coliseum12,666
| 0–1
|- align="center" bgcolor="#ccffcc"
| 2
| April 20
| Phoenix
| W 122–116
| Jim Paxson (27)
| Mychal Thompson (13)
| Darnell Valentine (8)
| Memorial Coliseum12,666
| 1–1
|- align="center" bgcolor="#ffcccc"
| 3
| April 22
| @ Phoenix
| L 103–106
| Darnell Valentine (29)
| Thompson, Carr (8)
| Darnell Valentine (10)
| Arizona Veterans Memorial Coliseum11,531
| 1–2
|- align="center" bgcolor="#ccffcc"
| 4
| April 24
| @ Phoenix
| W 113–110
| Calvin Natt (30)
| Calvin Natt (8)
| Darnell Valentine (13)
| Arizona Veterans Memorial Coliseum14,660
| 2–2
|- align="center" bgcolor="#ffcccc"
| 5
| April 26
| Phoenix
| L 105–117
| Jim Paxson (24)
| Natt, Drexler (10)
| Darnell Valentine (5)
| Memorial Coliseum12,666
| 2–3
|-

Player statistics

Season

Playoffs

Awards and records

Awards
 Jim Paxson, All-NBA Second Team

Records

Transactions

Trades

Free Agents

Additions

Subtractions

See also
 1983–84 NBA season

References

Portland Trail Blazers seasons
Portland Trail Blazers 1983
Portland Trail Blazers 1983
Po
Portland
Portland